"Goodbye" is the sixth single by Australian dance group Sneaky Sound System, taken from their self-titled debut album Sneaky Sound System. "Goodbye" has a point of difference from the previous singles – it features lead vocals from MC Double D. It peaked at No.33 on the ARIA Singles Chart. A new radio mix was produced for the single, removing the third verse. The extended mix retains the third verse.

Track listing

Personnel
 Black Angus – producer
 Miss Connie – vocals
 Peter Dolso – engineer, mixing, producer
 MC Double D – vocals
 Jonny Powell – remix, additional production 
 John-Paul Talbot – remix, additional production 
 Goodwill – remix, additional production

Charts

Release history

References

External links
Australian CD single on Waterfront Records

Sneaky Sound System songs
2007 singles
2006 songs
Songs written by Connie Mitchell